Phalonidia elderana is a species of moth of the family Tortricidae. It is found in the United States, where it has been recorded from New Jersey.

The wingspan is about 13 mm. Adults have been recorded on wing in July.

References

Moths described in 1907
Phalonidia